Māngere railway station was a station at Mangere on the Eastern and Southern Lines of the Auckland railway network.  It had an offset side platform layout with no connection between the two platforms. Both the northbound and southbound platforms have since been demolished.

Closure
Because of lack of patronage, from 25 October 2005 the only services stopping at the station were four south-bound morning peak services to set down passengers on school days only, for pupils of nearby King's College. The station exit was close to the school.

The station closed permanently on 9 December 2011. The closure was proposed due to the limited number of services (only four trains per day during the school term), the short-distance to/from Middlemore Station, and the cost to upgrade the station to meet current standards. There was only very limited opposition from the public.

See also 
List of Auckland railway stations

References 

Rail transport in Auckland
Railway stations opened in 1930
Railway stations closed in 2011